Jaya Puranprakash Sharma (born 17 September 1980) is an Indian former cricketer who played as a left-handed batter. She appeared in one Test match, 77 One Day Internationals and one Twenty20 International for India between 2002 and 2008, including playing at the 2005 World Cup. She played domestic cricket for Delhi, Railways and Rajasthan.

She was the first female recipient of the BCCI Player of the Year award, in 2007. Her 138* against Pakistan at the 2005–06 Women's Asia Cup is the third highest score for India in Women's ODIs.

One Day International centuries

References

External links
 
 

1980 births
Living people
Sportspeople from Ghaziabad, Uttar Pradesh
Indian women cricketers
India women Test cricketers
India women One Day International cricketers
India women Twenty20 International cricketers
Railways women cricketers
Delhi women cricketers
Rajasthan women cricketers
Central Zone women cricketers
North Zone women cricketers